Ammatucha piti is a species of snout moth in the genus Ammatucha. It was described by Roesler, in 1983, and is known from Sumatra.

References

Moths described in 1983
Phycitini
Moths of Indonesia